Sollie, Solie or Solié is a surname and given name which may refer to:

Surname
André Sollie (born 1947), Flemish author and illustrator of children's literature
Gordon Solie (1929–2000), American professional wrestling play-by-play announcer born Francis Jonard Labiak
Hans Johan Sollie (1885–?), Norwegian bookseller and politician
Harald Bredo Sollie (1871–1947), Norwegian politician, jurist and naval officer
Jean-Pierre Solié (1755–1812), French cellist, opera singer and composer
Karen Solie (born 1966), Canadian poet
Kjell Jakob Sollie (born 1953), Norwegian cross-country skier
Solveig Sollie (born 1939), Norwegian politician
Vigdis Sollie, competitor at the Miss World 1967 pageant

Given name
Sollie Cohen (1907–1966), American college football player
Sollie Norwood (born 1952), elected to the Mississippi State Senate in 2013
Sollie "Tex" Williams (1917–1985), American Western swing musician

See also
 Solly (disambiguation)